The fifth series of the British sitcom series 'Allo 'Allo! contains twenty-six episodes which first aired between 3 September 1988 and 25 February 1989.

Series 5 is longer than any of the other series, and contains almost a third of the total number of episodes. The series was made with a view to airing the show in the US, so episodes were shortened to 25 minutes rather than 30 minutes to allow for commercial breaks; and twenty-six episodes were commissioned to tie in with the American tradition of having "seasons", rather than the typical British "series" of six to eight episodes. Due to these changes, two episodes were written by different writers; the director's role was shared between four people, the series was taped entirely in the studio (except the wedding scene of episode 6, which was shot on location in an actual church); and not all of the secondary characters appear in each of the series' episodes. Series 5 also sees the first appearances of the Communist Resistance girls Denise Laroque and Louise; and the last appearance of Jack Haig (who died in the time between the fifth and sixth series) as Monsieur Roger LeClerc.

The following episode names are the ones found on the British R2 DVDs with alternate region titles given below them.

Cast

Episodes

References

External links

1988 British television seasons
1989 British television seasons
 5
'Allo 'Allo! seasons